Dmitry Varats (born December 8, 1988) is a Featherweight Belarusian Muay Thai kickboxer.

Career 
October 11, 2014 in Russia W5 Grand Prix, Dmitry Varats defeated Sergey Kulyaba win the 2014 W5 Grand Prix -66 kg tournament Championship belt.

October 29, 2016 in Pattaya, Thailand Topking World Series 8, Final, Dmitry Varats defeated Khayal Dzhaniev via extra round decision to win the Toking World Series -70 kg tournament Championship belt.

Championships and awards

Muay Thai
Professional
Top King World Series
2015 Topking World Series -70 kg tournament Championship
Power of Scotland
2008 Power of Scotland tournament Runner-Up
Golden Fight
2019 Golden Fight Tournament Championship
Amateur
International Federation of Muaythai Associations
2022 IFMA European Championships -67kg 
2021 IFMA World Championships -67kg 
2019 IFMA European Championships -67kg 
2019 IFMA World Championships -67kg 
2018 IFMA World Championships -67kg 
2017 IFMA World Championships -67kg 
2016 IFMA-EMF European Championships -67kg 
2014 IFMA-EMF European Championships -63.5kg 
2014 IFMA World Championships -63.5kg 
2013 IFMA World Championships -63.5kg 
2013 IFMA European Championships -63.5kg 
2012 IFMA European Championships -63.5kg 
2011 IFMA European Championships -60kg 
2010 IFMA World Championships -60kg 

World Combat Games
 2013 World Combat Games -63.5kg

Kickboxing
W5
2014 W5 Grand Prix -66 kg tournament Championship

Fight record

|-  style="background:#;"
| 2023-02-18 || || align=left| || Golden Fight || Paris, France ||  ||  || 
|-  style="background:#fbb;"
| 2022-07-06 || Loss||align=left| Buakaw Banchamek || World Fight Kun Khmer Series || Phnom Penh, Cambodia || Decision || 3 || 3:00
|- style="background:#cfc;"
| 2021-10-16 || Win ||align=left| Ott Remmer || KOK 94 World Championship in Tallinn || Tallinn, Estonia || Decision || 3 ||

|- style="background:#cfc;"
| 2021-5-21 || Win ||align=left| Przemyslaw Kierpacz || KOK 88 World Series in Warsaw || Warsaw, Poland || TKO || 2 ||

|- style="background:#cfc;"
| 2019-12-14 || Win ||align=left| Saengsam || Golden Fight Tournament Final || Paris, France || KO || 1 ||
|-
! style=background:white colspan=9 |Wins the 2019 Golden Fight Tournament Championship.

|- style="background:#cfc;"
| 2019-12-14 || Win ||align=left| Morgan Adrar || Golden Fight Tournament Semi Finals || Paris, France || Decision || 3 ||

|- style="background:#fbb;"
| 2019-05-25 || Loss ||align=left| Qiu Jianliang|| Glory of Heroes 38: Shantou || Shantou, China || TKO (retirement)|| 2 || 3:00
|-
! style=background:white colspan=9 |For the 2019 ISKA Junior Lightweight (-67 kg) World Championship.

|- style="background:#cfc;"
| 2018-12-01 || Win ||align=left| Celestin Mendes || Credissimo Golden Fight || Levallois Perret, France || TKO || 4 ||
|- style="background:#cfc;"
| 2018-08-05 || Win ||align=left| Damian Johanen ||  ACK KB 17 || Russia || Decision (Uanimous) || 3 || 3:00
|- style="background:#cfc;"
| 2018-03-24 || Win ||align=left| Marco Novak || Hanuman Cup 37 || Slovakia || Decision || 5 || 3:00
|- style="background:#fbb;"
| 2017-05-27 || Loss ||align=left| Chujaroen Dabransarakarm || Top King 13 World Series || China || Decision || 3 || 3:00
|- style="background:#cfc;"
| 2017-01-14 || Win ||align=left| Li Chinrui || Top King World Series || China || KO || 2 ||
|- style="background:#fbb;"
| 2016-08-27 || Loss ||align=left| Yodwicha Por Boonsit || Top King World Series 10 || Yantai, China  || Decision || 3 || 3:00
|-  style="background:#fbb;"
| 2016-07-02 || Loss||align=left| Tie Yinghua || Glory of Heroes 3  || Jiyuan, China || Extra Round Decision || 4 || 3:00
|- style="background:#cfc;"
| 2015-12-28 || Win ||align=left| Khayal Dzhaniev || Topking World Series 8, Final || Pattaya, Thailand || Ex.R Decision || 4 ||
|-
! style=background:white colspan=9 |Wins the 2015 Topking World Series -70 kg tournament Championship.
|- style="background:#cfc;"
| 2015-12-28 || Win ||align=left| Kem Sitsongpeenong || Topking World Series 8, Semi Finals|| Pattaya, Thailand || TKO (Punches) || 1 ||
|-  style="background:#fbb;"
| 2015-10-17 || Loss ||align=left| Jimmy Vienot || Topking World Series || China || Decision || 3|| 3:00
|-  style="background:#cfc;"
| 2015-10-03 || Win ||align=left| Nathan Robson || Xtreme Muay Thai 2015 || Macau || Decision || 3 || 3:00
|-  style="background:#cfc;"
| 2015-09-20 || Win ||align=left| Dechrid Sathian Muaythai Gym || Topking World Series TK6 || Vientiane, Laos || Decision || 3 || 3:00
|-  style="background:#fbb;"
| 2015-07-28 || Loss ||align=left| Pakorn P.K. Saenchai Muaythaigym || TopKing World Series 4 || Hongkong, China || Decision || 3 || 3:00
|-  style="background:#fbb;"
| 2015-04-11 || Loss ||align=left| Sak Kaoponlek || Oktagon || Assago, Italy || Decision || 3 || 3:00
|-  style="background:#cfc;"
| 2014-11-30 || Win ||align=left| Dmitry Grafov || W5 Grand Prix Final || Russia || Decision || 3 || 3:00
|-  style="background:#cfc;"
| 2014-11-30 || Win ||align=left| Thongchai Kiatprapat || W5 Grand Prix Final || Russia || Decision || 3 || 3:00
|-  style="background:#cfc;"
| 2014-10-11 || Win ||align=left| Sergey Kulyaba || W5 Grand Prix Final || Russia || Decision || 3 || 3:00
|-
! style=background:white colspan=9 |Wins the 2014 W5 Grand Prix -66 kg tournament Championship.
|-  style="background:#cfc;"
| 2014-10-11 || Win ||align=left| Rasul Kachakaev || W5 Grand Prix Semi Finals || Russia || Decision || 3 || 3:00
|-  style="background:#cfc;"
| 2014-09-13 || Win ||align=left| Rungravee Sasiprapa || Topking World Series || Minsk, Belarus || KO (Right Head Kick) || 1 ||
|-  style="background:#cfc;"
| 2014-03-01 || Win||align=left| Rudolf Durica || W5 Grand Prix Orel XXIV || Orel, Russia || Decision || 3 || 3:00
|-  style="background:#cfc;"
| 2013-11-16 || Win||align=left| Yuri Zhukovsskiy || W5 Grand Prix Orel || Orel, Russia || Decision || 3 || 3:00
|-  style="background:#fbb;"
| 2013-04-24 || Loss ||align=left| Sergey Kulyaba || W5 Grand Prix Orel XXI || Russia || Decision || 3 || 3:00
|-  style="background:#c5d2ea;"
| 2012-06-03 || No Contest ||align=left| Tomasz Makowski || Kings Of Muay Thai || Hrodna, Belarus ||  ||  ||
|-  style="background:#cfc;"
| 2012-04-27 || Win ||align=left| Maxim Kolpak || Mortal Bet || Russia || KO || 1 ||
|-  style="background:#cfc;"
| 2010-04-16 || Win ||align=left| Igor Frunze || Mix Fight || Belarus || KO || 1 ||
|-  style="background:#fbb;"
| 2009-09-12 || Loss ||align=left| Dean James || Warrington Fight Night || United Kingdom || Decision || 3 || 3:00
|-
! style=background:white colspan=9 |For the 2009 WMC European Championship.
|-  style="background:#fbb;"
| 2008-05-04 || Loss ||align=left| Sebastien Ocaña || Power of Scotland 4 Tournament Final || United Kingdom || Decision || 3 ||
|-
! style=background:white colspan=9 |For the 2008 Power of Scotland tournament Championship.
|-  style="background:#cfc;"
| 2008-05-04 || Win ||align=left| Andy Howson || Power of Scotland 4 Tournament Semi Finals || United Kingdom || TKO || 2 ||
|-  style="background:#cfc;"
| 2008-05-04 || Win ||align=left| Albert Veera Chey || Power of Scotland 4 Tournament Quarter Finals || United Kingdom || Decision || 3 || 3:00
|-  style="background:#cfc;"
| 2007-04-21 || Win ||align=left| Tomasz Makowski || Muay Thai || Hrodna, Belarus || KO || 3 || 3:00
|-  style="background:#cfc;"
| 2006-11-26 || Win ||align=left| Damien Trainor || Muay Thai Super Fight || United Kingdom || Decision || 3 || 3:00
|-
| colspan=9 | Legend:    

|-  style="background:#cfc;"
| 2022-02-20 || Win||align=left| Erdem taha Dincer || 2022 IFMA European Championships, Final || Istanbul, Turkey || Decision (29:28)|| 3 || 3:00
|-
! style=background:white colspan=9 |

|-  style="background:#cfc;"
| 2022-02-19 || Win||align=left| Igor Liubchenko || 2022 IFMA European Championships, Semi Finals || Istanbul, Turkey || RSCH|| 3 ||

|-  style="background:#cfc;"
| 2022-02-17 || Win||align=left| Alexis Sautron || 2022 IFMA European Championships, Quarter Finals || Istanbul, Turkey || RSCO || 3 ||

|-  style="background:#fbb;"
| 2021-12-10 || Loss ||align=left| Anueng Khatthamarasri || 2021 IFMA World Championships, Semi Finals || Bangkok, Thailand || Decision (29:28) || 3 ||3:00
|-
! style=background:white colspan=9 |
|-  style="background:#cfc;"
| 2021-12-09 || Win ||align=left| Itai Gayer || 2021 IFMA World Championships, Quarter Finals || Bangkok, Thailand || Decision (30:27)|| 3 || 3:00

|-  style="background:#cfc;"
| 2021-12-08 || Win ||align=left| Georgios Moustakis || 2021 IFMA World Championships, Second Round || Bangkok, Thailand ||RSCB ||1||

|-  style="background:#cfc;"
| 2021-12-08 || Win ||align=left| Kirill Khomutov|| 2021 IFMA World Championships, First Round || Bangkok, Thailand || RSCH ||3||

|-  bgcolor="#fbb"
| 2019-11-10 || Loss||align=left| Itay Gayer || 2019 IFMA European Championships, Final|| Minsk, Belarus || Decision (29:27)|| 3 ||3:00 
|-
! style=background:white colspan=9 |

|-  bgcolor="#CCFFCC"
| 2019-11-08 || Win||align=left| Oumar Bathily || 2019 IFMA European Championships, Semi Finals|| Minsk, Belarus || Decision (30:27)|| 3 ||3:00 

|-  bgcolor="#CCFFCC"
| 2019-11-06 || Win||align=left| Alexey Balyko || 2019 IFMA European Championships, Quarter Finals|| Minsk, Belarus || Decision (30:27)|| 3 ||3:00 

|-  bgcolor="#fbb"
| 2019-07-26 || Loss||align=left| Spéth Norbert Attila || 2019 IFMA World Championships, Semi Final|| Bangkok, Thailand || Decision (30:27)|| 3 || 3:00
|-
! style=background:white colspan=9 |
|-  bgcolor="#CCFFCC"
| 2019-07-25 || Win||align=left| Nouredine Samir || 2019 IFMA World Championships, Quarter Final|| Bangkok, Thailand || RSCO|| 3 ||

|-  bgcolor="#CCFFCC"
| 2019-07-24 || Win||align=left| Surachai Sosom || 2019 IFMA World Championships, Second Round|| Bangkok, Thailand || Decision (30:27)|| 3 || 3:00

|-  bgcolor="#CCFFCC"
| 2018-05-19 || Win||align=left| Spéth Norbert Attila || 2018 IFMA World Championships, Final|| Cancún, Mexico || Decision (30:27)|| 3 ||3:00 
|-
! style=background:white colspan=9 |

|-  bgcolor="#CCFFCC"
| 2018-05-16 || Win||align=left| Zhanibek Kanatbayev || 2018 IFMA World Championships, Semi Final|| Cancún, Mexico || Decision (30:27)|| 3 ||3:00

|-  bgcolor="#CCFFCC"
| 2018-05-14 || Win||align=left| Sergey Kosykh || 2018 IFMA World Championships, Quarter Final|| Cancún, Mexico || Decision (30:27)|| 3 || 3:00

|-  bgcolor="#CCFFCC"
| 2018-05-12 || Win||align=left| Henry Lee || 2018 IFMA World Championships, Second Round|| Cancún, Mexico || RSCH|| 3 ||

|-  style="background:#cfc;"
| 2017-05-12 || Win||align=left| Mana Samchaiyaphum || 2017 IFMA World Championships, Final || Minsk, Belarus || RSCB|| 3 || 
|-
! style=background:white colspan=9 |

|-  style="background:#cfc;"
| 2017-05-10 || Win||align=left| Oleh Huta || 2017 IFMA World Championships, Semi Final || Minsk, Belarus || RSCH|| 1|| 

|-  style="background:#cfc;"
| 2017-05-07 || Win||align=left| Mateusz Janik || 2017 IFMA World Championships, Quarter Final || Minsk, Belarus || RSCO|| 1|| 

|-  bgcolor="#cfc"
| 2016-10-29 || Win ||align=left| Ali Batmaz|| 2016 IFMA European Championships, Final || Split, Croatia || Decision (30:27) || 3 || 3:00
|-
! style=background:white colspan=9 |

|-  bgcolor="#cfc"
| 2016-10-27 || Win ||align=left| Vasyl Sorokin|| 2016 IFMA European Championships, Semi Final || Split, Croatia || Decision (30:27) || 3 || 3:00

|-  bgcolor="#cfc"
| 2016-10-24 || Win ||align=left| Thibaut Arias|| 2016 IFMA European Championships, Quarter Final || Split, Croatia || Decision (30:27) || 3 || 3:00

|-  bgcolor="#fbb"
| 2016-05-21 || Loss ||align=left| Yutthapong Sitthichot|| 2016 IFMA World Championships, 1/8 Finals || Jonkoping, Sweden || Decision (29:28) || 3 || 3:00

|-  bgcolor="#fbb"
| 2015-08- || Loss ||align=left| Magomed Zaynukov || 2015 IFMA Royal World Cup, 1/8 Finals|| Bangkok, Thailand || Decision ||  || 

|-  bgcolor="#cfc"
| 2014-09- || Win ||align=left| Igor Liubchenko|| 2014 IFMA European Championships, Final || Krakow, Poland || Decision || 3 || 3:00
|-
! style=background:white colspan=9 |

|-  bgcolor="#cfc"
| 2014-09- || Win ||align=left| Peter Sazonov || 2014 IFMA European Championships, Semi Finals|| Krakow, Poland || Decision || 3 || 3:00

|-  bgcolor="#cfc"
| 2014-09- || Win ||align=left| Ahmed Moufti|| 2014 IFMA European Championships, Quarter Finals|| Krakow, Poland || Decision || 3 || 3:00

|-  bgcolor="#fbb"
| 2014-05- || Loss ||align=left| Igor Liubchenko || 2014 IFMA World Championships, Quarter Finals|| Langkawi, Malaysia || Decision || 3 || 3:00
|-
! style=background:white colspan=9 |

|-  bgcolor="#cfc"
| 2014-05- || Win ||align=left| Andrea Arduini || 2014 IFMA World Championships, Semi Finals|| Langkawi, Malaysia || Decision || 3 || 3:00

|-  bgcolor="#cfc"
| 2014-05- || Win ||align=left| Khochbar Aygubov|| 2014 IFMA World Championships, Quarter Finals|| Langkawi, Malaysia || Decision || 3 || 3:00

|-  bgcolor="#cfc"
| 2014-05- || Win ||align=left| Masoud Abdolmaleki || 2014 IFMA World Championships, 1/8 Finals|| Langkawi, Malaysia || ||  || 

|-  style="background:#fbb;"
| 2013-10-21 || Loss||align=left| Igor Liubchenko || 2013 World Combat Games, Semi Final || Bangkok, Thailand || Decision ||  ||
|-
! style=background:white colspan=9 |

|-  style="background:#cfc;"
| 2013-07-|| Win ||align=left| Kaplan Abukov|| 2013 IFMA European Championship, Final || Lisbon, Portugal || Decision  || 4 || 2:00
|-
! style=background:white colspan=8 |

|-  style="background:#fbb;"
| 2012-09-13|| Loss||align=left| Hakeem Dawodu || 2012 IFMA World Championship, Bronze Medal fight || Saint Petersburg, Russia || Decision  || 3 || 3:00 
|-
! style=background:white colspan=9 |

|-  bgcolor="#fbb"
| 2012-09-11 || Loss ||align=left| Klumya Akephon || 2012 IFMA World Championships, Semi Finals|| Saint Petersburg, Russia ||  ||  ||

|-  bgcolor="#cfc"
| 2012-09-10 || Win||align=left| Zhanserik Amirzhanov|| 2012 IFMA World Championships, Quarter Finals|| Saint-Petersburg, Russia ||  ||  || 

|-  bgcolor="#cfc"
| 2012-09-08 || Win ||align=left| Mirbek Suiumbaev || 2012 IFMA World Championships, First Round|| Saint Petersburg, Russia ||  ||  || 

|-  style="background:#cfc;"
| 2012-04-|| Win||align=left| Igor Liubchenko || 2012 IFMA European Championships 2012, Final || Antalya, Turkey || Decision || 3 || 3:00
|-
! style=background:white colspan=9 |

|-  style="background:#fbb;"
| 2011-09-25|| Loss||align=left| Wuttichai Meejan || 2011 IFMA World Championships, Semi Finals || Tashkent, Uzbekistan || Decision|| 4 ||2:00 
|-
! style=background:white colspan=9 |

|-  style="background:#cfc;"
| 2011-09-23|| Win ||align=left| Vrani Caphin || 2011 IFMA World Championships, Quarter Finals || Tashkent, Uzbekistan || RSC.O|| 1 || 

|-  style="background:#cfc;"
| 2011-04-||Win ||align=left| Igor Liubchenko || 2011 IFMA European Championships, Final || Antalya, Turkey || Decision || 4 || 2:00
|-
! style=background:white colspan=9 |

|-  style="background:#cfc;"
| 2011-04-|| Win ||align=left| || 2011 IFMA European Championships, Semi Finals || Antalya, Turkey || ||  || 

|-  style="background:#cfc;"
| 2011-04-27|| Win ||align=left| || 2011 IFMA European Championships, Quarter Finals || Antalya, Turkey || ||  || 

|-  style="background:#cfc;"
| 2011-04-25|| Win ||align=left| Akhmed Haybulaev|| 2011 IFMA European Championships, 1/8 Finals || Antalya, Turkey || Decision|| 4 ||2:00 

|-  style="background:#FFBBBB;"
| 2010-12- || Loss ||align=left|  || 2010 I.F.M.A. World Muaythai Championships, Semi Finals || Bangkok, Thailand || ||||
|-
! style=background:white colspan=9 |
|-  style="background:#cfc;"
| 2010-12- || Win||align=left| igor Liubchenko || 2010 I.F.M.A. World Muaythai Championships, Quarter Finals || Bangkok, Thailand || ||||
|-
| colspan=9 | Legend:

References 

1988 births
Living people
Belarusian male kickboxers
Featherweight kickboxers
Lightweight kickboxers
Belarusian Muay Thai practitioners